Baldassarre Giustiniani (died 13 March 1584) was a Roman Catholic prelate who served as Bishop of Venosa (1572–1584).

Biography
On 6 February 1572, Baldassarre Giustiniani was appointed during the papacy of Pope Pius V as Bishop of Venosa.
On 13 April 1572, he was consecrated bishop by Archangelo de' Bianchi, Bishop of Teano, with Bartolomeo Ferro, Bishop of Terni, and Vincenzo Ercolano, Bishop of Sarno, serving as co-consecrators. 
He served as Bishop of Venosa until his death on 13 March 1584.

References

External links and additional sources
 (for Chronology of Bishops) 
 (for Chronology of Bishops) 

16th-century Italian Roman Catholic bishops
Bishops appointed by Pope Pius V
1584 deaths